Caldwell's view (or Occipitofrontal view) is a radiographic view of skull, where X-ray plate is perpendicular to the orbitomeatal line. The rays pass from behind the head and are angled at 15-20° to the radiographic plate. It is commonly used to get better view of the ethmoid and frontal sinuses.   It is named after the noted American radiologist Eugene W. Caldwell, who described it in 1907.

Structures seen
 Frontal sinus
 Ethmoidal sinus
 Orbit
 Orbital rim
 Medial orbital wall
 Zygomatic bone
 Nasal bone
 Nasal septum
 Mandible

Possible observations

References

Radiography
Radiology